Altas may refer to:

 Perpetual Altas, a Philippine sports team
 Altaş, Ardahan, a village in Ardahan Province, Turkey
 , a village in Afşin District, Kahramanmaraş Province, Turkey

See also
Altass, a village in Scotland
 
 Alta (disambiguation)
 Atlas (disambiguation)